Homestead is an unincorporated community in Iowa County, Iowa, United States. It has the ZIP code 52236.

Homestead is a census-designated place with the population recorded as 148 in the 2010 census.

Geography
Homestead is in northeastern Iowa County at the junction of U.S. Route 151 with U.S. Route 6. US 151 leads northeast  to Cedar Rapids and west, then south  to Interstate 80, while US 6 leads east  to Iowa City and west  to Marengo, the Iowa County seat.

Demographics

History
The Amana Colonies purchased the town from the Rock Island Railroad to use as a transportation hub. A meteorite struck the town in 1875.

In 1881, Homestead contained a train depot, hotel, post office, grain elevator, meeting house, schoolhouse, general store, lumber yard, and a large distributing warehouse.

Popular culture
Ashton Kutcher and his family lived four miles out of town. Ashton refers to Homestead as his hometown, as he lived there after his family relocated.
Homestead serves at the setting for the Hallmark movie "Christmas in Homestead", but nothing was filmed in the town.

References

Amana Colonies
Unincorporated communities in Iowa
Unincorporated communities in Iowa County, Iowa
Census-designated places in Iowa County, Iowa